Hannah Espia (born 15 May 1987) is a Filipina director best known for her 2013 film Transit.

References

External links

Living people
Filipino film directors
Place of birth missing (living people)
Filipino women film directors
1987 births